The 2015–16 Ball State Cardinals men's basketball team represented Ball State University during the 2015–16 NCAA Division I men's basketball season. The Cardinals, led by third year head coach James Whitford, played their home games at Worthen Arena as members of the West Division of the Mid-American Conference. They finished the season 21–14, 10–8 in MAC play to finish in a tie for the West Division championship. They lost to Miami (OH) in the first round of the MAC tournament. They were invited to the CollegeInsider.com Tournament where they defeated Tennessee State and UT Martin to advance to the quarterfinals where they lost to Columbia.

Previous season
The Cardinals finished the previous season 7–23, 2–16 in MAC play to finish in last place in the West Division. They lost in the first round of the MAC tournament to Bowling Green.

Departures

Incoming Transfers

Recruiting class of 2015

Roster

Schedule
Source: 

|-
!colspan=9 style="background:#C41E3A; color:#FFFFFF;"| Non-conference regular season

|-
!colspan=9 style="background:#C41E3A; color:#FFFFFF;"| MAC regular season

|-
!colspan=9 style="background:#C41E3A; color:#FFFFFF;"| MAC tournament

|-
!colspan=9 style="background:#C41E3A; color:#FFFFFF;"| CIT

References

Ball State
Ball State Cardinals men's basketball seasons
Ball State